Nataliia Mandryk (born 15 January 1988) is a Ukrainian wheelchair fencer.

Mandryk competed at the 2020 Summer Paralympics where she won a silver medal in the épée team event.

References

1988 births
Living people
Ukrainian female épée fencers
Paralympic wheelchair fencers of Ukraine
Paralympic silver medalists for Ukraine
Wheelchair fencers at the 2020 Summer Paralympics
Medalists at the 2020 Summer Paralympics
Paralympic medalists in wheelchair fencing
21st-century Ukrainian women